Ahmad Al-Khowaiter (Arabic: احمد الخويطر) is a Saudi  chemical engineer  and the current CTO of Saudi Aramco.

Education
Al-Khowaiter earned a B.S. degree in Chemical Engineering from the King Fahd University of Petroleum & Minerals (KFUPM), an M.S. degree in Chemical Engineering from the University of California at Santa Barbara, and an MBA degree from the Sloan business school at the Massachusetts Institute of Technology.

See also
Economy of Saudi Arabia

References

External links
(Arabic) أحمد الخويطر

Living people
Year of birth missing (living people)